Balanophora coralliformis, sometimes known as coral plant, is a flowering plant in the family Balanophoraceae and is known only from Mount Mingan on the island of Luzon in the Philippines. Like others in its genus, it is an obligate parasite growing on the roots of rainforest trees, but differs in that its tuber appears above ground and has an elongated, repeatedly branched, coral-like structure. It was first described in 2014 and is known from fewer than 50 plants, but has not as yet been declared endangered.

Description
Like other members of its genus, B. coralliformis is holoparasitic and contains no chlorophyll. There are 4, sometimes 5 yellow to straw-coloured overlapping, concave, egg-shaped leaves, arranged at about the same level around each segment of the above-ground tuber.

The plant is dioecious, having separate pistillate (female) and staminate (male) plants. The flowers appear at the end of each tuber segment, arranged in racemes.

Taxonomy and naming
Balanophora coralliformis was first formally described in 2014 by Julie Barcelona, Pieter Pelser and Danilo Tandang from a specimen found on the Mount Mingan summit trail in Central Luzon. The specific epithet (coralliformis) refers to the coral-like form of the species' tuber. In 2015, the International Institute for Species Exploration names it as one of the "Top 10 New Species" for species discovered in 2014.

Distribution and habitat
Balanophora papuana is also found in this area.

Conservation
Fewer than 50 plants of B. coralliformis have been found and none has been observed in similar areas in Nueva Ecija and Aurora provinces but the species has not yet been declared endangered and Mount Mingan is not currently a protected area. However, the habitat of B. coralliformis is threatened by illegal logging and slash and burn agriculture.

References

coralliformis
Flora of the Philippines
Plants described in 2014
Dioecious plants
Taxa named by Danilo Tandang